Thara Ak-Var is a fictional character appearing in comic books published by DC Comics, created by Geoff Johns and James Robinson. The character first appeared during the Superman: New Krypton storyline in Superman #681 (October 2008). She is the latest character to take on the role of Flamebird. Along with the new Nightwing, Thara is the feature character in Action Comics beginning with issue #875 (May 2009). Thara Ak-Var's name is a reference to Ak-Var, who was the second pre-Crisis Flamebird, and his wife, Thara.

This character was portrayed by Esmé Bianco in the third season of Supergirl.

Fictional character biography

Silver Age
In the Silver Age, Thara was the wife of Ak-Var, lab assistant to the Kandorian scientist Van-Zee, who was also Thara's uncle. At one point, Van-Zee donned the Nightwing costume in order to rescue a captured Superman. After Superman and Jimmy's departure from Kandor, Van-Zee took up the role of Nightwing full-time. Ak-Var later assumed the mantle of Flamebird. The two shared several distinct adventures, once teaming up with Superman and Jimmy.

Modern Age
Thara Ak-Var lived in Argo City and was a childhood friend of Kara Zor-El. While Kara's parents were members of the Science Guild, Thara's parents were both of the Military Guild and had served under General Zod.

Thara was among the few survivors of Krypton’s destruction. Zor-El created a force field around all of Argo City to protect it using technology found after Brainiac’s capture of Kandor. Sensing his own technology being used, Brainiac tracked down Argo City and began to integrate it with Kandor, and killing those who tried to stop him, including Thara's parents. While Zor-El and Alura managed to assist their daughter in escaping, everyone else in Argo City was captured by Brainiac, including Thara.

Life in the shrunken city continued, though at a slower rate than the rest of the universe. Despite her young age and inexperience in actual combat, Thara was made chief of security for Kandor. She was adamant that no one think she did not earn her position.

Shortly afterward, Thara was approached by Kandor's religious guild, who conducted a ceremony that granted Thara a vision of the Flamebird, a mythical Kryptonian creature. The religious guild, believing Thara to be the living avatar of the Flamebird, took her into their ranks. One day Thara felt her mind connect with that of Chris Kent's, who himself seemed to have some kind of connection to the Nightwing, the Flamebird's partner deity. Reclaiming her position as chief of Security, Thara used a protective suit invented by Zor-El to enter the Phantom Zone, free Chris, and bring him to Kandor in secret.

When Superman discovered Kandor in Brainiac's ship, the imprisoned Kryptonians were all freed. Thara was reunited with her friend, Kara.

New Krypton
When the Kryptonians agreed to meet with the President of the United States in Metropolis, it was Thara who trained Zor-El and Alura's escorts. She also organized the evacuation of the area when Doomsday attacked the Kryptonian delegation. After Kara's father, Zor-El, was murdered by Reactron in Kandor, Alura came to blame Thara for her husband's death, as security within the city was her responsibility.

Thara Ak-Var began operating on Earth as the superhero Flamebird, aided by Chris as Nightwing. Both heroes work from the Fortress of Solitude where they initially stood guard over the Phantom Zone projector to stop Kryptonian soldiers from releasing Zod.

A World Without Superman
After all Kryptonians except for Superman are restricted from coming to Earth, Thara and Chris Kent remained behind in their guises of Flamebird and Nightwing. To further hide their Kryptonian origins, the duo began wearing powersuit versions of their costumes. The young heroes are tracking down Kryptonian sleeper agents operating on Earth by order of General Zod. Chris discovered the identities of these agents while his parents kept him prisoner in the Phantom Zone.

When Zod became aware of Flamebird and Nightwing's actions against his agents he sent Ursa to Earth to stop them. After a brutal attack by Ursa, Thara left gravely wounded by a frangible Kryptonite knife, and Chris was forced to bring her to Lois Lane for medical assistance. She was saved by the efforts of the JLA heroine, Doctor Light who used her powers to accelerate her sun absorption. Thara recovered, and joined Chris in an attempt to bring in a violent sleeper couple. Their battle was interrupted by a group of meta-human adversaries led by Codename: Assassin. During the fight, the sleepers escaped, pursued by Chris. Codename: Assassin's forces managed to pin Thara, and he used his psychic abilities to read her mind, learning about Chris and the sleepers. When Assassin threatened Chris's life, Thara's body erupted into flames, and she screamed "Get out of our mind!" in Kryptonian. Thara went on to defeat her attackers, but left them alive, stating: "We are not vengeful. But we will fight to protect what is ours, what we love. You are warned". After battling the sleeper couple, Chris and Thara become celebrity superheroes with an adoring public. Thara was uncomfortable with the female attention Chris got, especially after discovering a fan's phone number stuffed into Chris's armor. Thara denied feelings of jealousy, but Chris responded by kissing her. The two were then attacked by the Kryptonian sleeper couple. They chased them into the subway, only to find that it was really Metallo and Reactron in disguise. Thara and Chris were then swiftly defeated and captured.

Chris and Thara are teleported away, along with Supergirl. Supergirl attacks Thara, for killing her father and trying to kill her, but Chris stops her and tells her he is her cousin. The three are attacked by Guardian and the Science Police, for apparently killing Mon-El. Chris tries to tell Guardian that they did not murder Mon-El, but Guardian ignores him. The three manage to escape to Paris. Chris, Thara and Kara talk about what has happened. They then discover that the two sleepers they were fighting were Metallo and Reactron. They are then attacked by Squad K.

Escaping from Squad K, the three go to Lana Lang's apartment. They decide to get Lois's help in clearing their names. Chris and Lana go to find Lois while Kara and Thara stay in Lana's apartment.

Once more while being left alone the two girls argue over their perceived betrayals of another, with Supergirl blaming Thara for her father's death and Thara being angry due to Kara not believing her about the Flamebird entity. After a brief argument the two along with Chris are once more forced to flee. During the attempt to flee they once more encounter Squad K but the three opt to surrender in order to clear their names. While they manage to persuade the Squad K commander, Reactron quickly murders his team-mates and attempts to kill the three.

During their conflict Thara is injured while attempting to protect Supergirl. As Reactron is about to kill Chris and Kara, Thara manifests her Flamebird powers and personality in which she easily overpowers and defeats Reactron. The Flamebird decides to kill Reactron but is swayed to show mercy after Reactron reveals that Mon-El is alive and is talked down by Supergirl. The Flamebird is once more submerged after sharing a kiss with Chris. Following their battle Thara and Kara make up, deciding to renew their friendship.

Donning new costumes, Thara and Chris continue to protect the world, making sure to conceal their Kryptonian status. Thara shows slight jealousy over Chris getting fangirl attention, and in the ensuing argument, shares another kiss. On their return to their apartment, however, Chris undergoes another aging spurt becoming an old man. Under Kimiyo Hoshi's direction, Thara takes Chris to the renowned Dr. Pillings, who, unbeknownst to anyone, is actually the Kryptonian sleeper agent Jax-Ur. "Pillings" intentionally subjects Chris to a treatment that causes him extreme pain, causing enough emotional stress in Thara for the Flamebird to become dominant again. Realizing who the doctor really is, the Flamebird is forced into an unspecified agreement with Jax-Ur, after which he ensures Chris/the Nightwing's survival.

Superman: War of the Supermen
In the 2010 mini-series Superman: War of the Supermen, as Zod and the New Kryptonians prepare to attack earth, General Lane, working with Lex Luthor, finds a way to turn Reactron into a living bomb that destroys all of New Krypton. At the same time, Lane and Luthor use elements from the Rao construct to turn the sun red, which depowers the Kryptonians, many of whom die in space. Flamebird realizes that the only way to save the surviving Kryptonians is to unleash her power in the heart of the sun. It is implied by the dialogue that this act is Thara's final destiny, and the artwork shows her skeletal remains.

Powers and abilities
Thara has all the standard abilities of a Kryptonian exposed to the light of a yellow sun: super strength, super speed, invulnerability, flight, heat vision, super-breath, x-ray vision, and super hearing. She also possesses an undefined connection to the mythic "Flamebird" entity, which gives her the ability to create flame, and gives her a psychic link to Chris Kent. This connection to the Flamebird seems to be symbiotic in nature, as Thara recently referred to herself as "we" when attacking the warriors who threatened Chris.

The "Flamebird" entity further displays an immunity to gold kryptonite and is able to restore Thara to full health even after she was injured by Reactron. Furthermore, the "Flamebird" seems to be, like Thara, attracted to Chris Kent.

Like all Kryptonians, Thara is weakened by Kryptonite radiation and fatally vulnerable to prolonged exposure.

In other media

Television
Thara Ak-Var appears in The CW’s live-action Arrowverse series Supergirl, portrayed by Esmé Bianco. She debuts in the third season episode "Not Kansas" and is portrayed as the police chief of Argo City, preserved after Krypton's explosion, and as the childhood friend of series protagonist, Kara Zor-El.

Film
Thara Ak-Var appears in Superman: Unbound, voiced by Melissa Disney. Thara is a resident of Kandor. During Braniac's abduction of the city, Kara, Thara, and their parents tried to flee the city by vehicle but the shield came down just before Thara's family could make it to safety.

References

Characters created by James Robinson
Comics characters introduced in 2008
DC Comics aliens
DC Comics characters who can move at superhuman speeds
DC Comics characters who have mental powers
DC Comics characters with accelerated healing
DC Comics characters with superhuman strength
DC Comics extraterrestrial superheroes
DC Comics female superheroes
DC Comics superheroes
Kryptonians
Fictional characters with slowed ageing
Fictional characters with X-ray vision
Fictional characters with superhuman senses
Fictional characters with nuclear or radiation abilities
Fictional characters with air or wind abilities
Fictional characters with ice or cold abilities
Fictional characters with absorption or parasitic abilities
Fictional characters with energy-manipulation abilities
Fictional characters with fire or heat abilities
Characters created by Geoff Johns
Superman characters
Flamebird